English singer and songwriter Lisa Stansfield has released eight solo studio albums and one with her band Blue Zone, four compilation albums, three remix albums, one soundtrack album, one extended play and forty-four singles. As of 2004, Stansfield has sold over 20 million records worldwide, including 5 million of Affection.

Her biggest hits include "People Hold On", "This Is the Right Time", "All Around the World", "Live Together", "What Did I Do to You?", "Change", "All Woman", "Time to Make You Mine", "Set Your Loving Free", "Someday (I'm Coming Back)", "In All the Right Places", "The Real Thing" and "Never, Never Gonna Give You Up". Stansfield released her latest studio album titled Deeper on 6 April 2018.

Albums

Studio albums

Live albums

Compilation albums

Remix albums

Soundtrack albums

Extended plays

Singles

Home videos

Music videos

Notes

References

Lisa Stansfield
Discographies of British artists
Pop music discographies
Rhythm and blues discographies
Soul music discographies